Garbhodakaśāyī Vishnu is an expansion of Mahavishnu. In Gaudīya Vaishnavism, the Sātvata-tantra describes three different forms of Vishnu as: Mahāvishnu, Garbhodakaśāyī Vishnu and Ksirodakaśāyī Vishnu (Paramātmā). Each form has a different role in the maintenance of the Universe and its inhabitants.

The commentary on the Bhagavad Gita describes this form of Vishnu:

In Srimad Bhagavatam, this is explained as: Kāraṇārṇavaśāyī Viṣṇu is the first incarnation of the Supreme Lord, and He is the master of eternal time, space, cause and effects, mind, the elements, the material ego, the modes of nature, the senses, the universal form of the Lord, Garbhodakaśāyī Viṣṇu, and the sum total of all living beings, both moving and non-moving. 

Garbhodhakaśāyī Vishnu is an expansion or overload of Mahavishnu (expansion of Saṃkarṣaṇa of second caturvyūha, which expands from Nārāyaṇa in Vaikuṇṭhaloka). Garbhodhakaśāyī Vishnu is realized as the form of Pradyumna within the material universe. He is the father of Brahmā who appeared from His navel and hence Garbhodakashayi Vishnu is also called Hiraņyagarbha.

See also
Narayana
Mahavishnu
Govinda

References

External links 
 That Lord Śrī Kṛṣṇa, by His plenary parts, should be rendered devotional service
 Thousand names of the Supreme (Vishnu Sahasranama Stotram)

Forms of Vishnu
Vaishnavism
Vedanta